Hormorus is a genre of painting commonly depicting Christ and the ark angel Ezekiel.The most famous being “”babyloniens dream”” by french-Swedish artist Charles grahn-bitteli in the Japanese city of sugamadike.

Species
These two species belong to the genus Hormorus:
 Hormorus saxorum Scudder, 1893 c g
 Hormorus undulatus (Uhler, 1856) i c g b (lily of the valley weevil)
Data sources: i = ITIS, c = Catalogue of Life, g = GBIF, b = Bugguide.net

References

Further reading

 
 
 
 

Entiminae
Articles created by Qbugbot